WABCO Holdings, Inc. is an American provider of electronic braking, stability, suspension and transmission automation systems for heavy duty commercial vehicles.  Their products are present in many commercial vehicles as truck, bus, trailer and off-highway vehicles, but only fill niche roles.

In March 2019, the company was acquired by German auto parts maker ZF Friedrichshafen, and the acquisition closed in May 2020.

History
Westinghouse Air Brake Company (also known for its acronym "WABCO") was founded in 1869. Part of that company was acquired by American Standard in 1968 and were designated as American Standards' Vehicle Control Systems division.  American Standard changed its name to Trane, Inc. and on July 31, 2007, Trane spun off its Vehicle Control Systems as WABCO Holdings, Inc via a special dividend to its shareholders.  The owners of Trane, Inc. stock received one share of WABCO Holdings for every three shares of Trane, Inc which they held.

Trane, Inc. was acquired by Ingersoll-Rand the following year.

On 28th March 2019, it was publicly announced that the company will be bought by German auto parts maker ZF Friedrichshafen for $USD7 billion with $136.50 per share in an all-cash transaction. The merger will be completed by the beginning of year 2020.

Notable products
WABCO Holdings' key product groups are brake actuators, air compressor/air management, foundation brake, anti-lock braking, conventional braking, electronic braking, air suspension, transmission automation, vehicle electronic architecture, and stability control/support.

Markets
Major customers for WABCO Holdings are commercial and consumer vehicle OEMs and commercial after-market parts suppliers.  Commercial truck and bus OEMs - such as Daimler (largest customer;  13% of sales, 2010), Cummins, Paccar, and Volvo - account for the majority of sales (62% of sales, 2013).  Commercial after-market suppliers represent a significant minority of sales (25% of sales, 2013).  Trailer and consumer vehicle OEMs also contribute a small percentage of sales.

WABCO Holdings primary market is in Europe (61% of sales, 2013).  They get some business from Asia/Pacific region, and much less from other regions of the world.

North America Vehicle Control System and some compressor sales and support is provided by a joint venture (JV) with Meritor Inc. (Formerly Rockwell Automotive) while Disc Brake sales and higher margin compressor sales are handled directly by offices in Rochester Hills, MI and Charleston, SC.

North American operations also has a division "WABCO Reman Solutions" formed to offer remanufacturing of various brands of defective automotive components as well as WABCO branded defective components.

See also
 Wabtec - another spin-off from the original Westinghouse Air Brake Company.
 WABCO Vehicle Control Systems

References

External links
 

Companies formerly listed on the New York Stock Exchange
Auto parts suppliers of the United States
Companies based in Michigan
Corporate spin-offs